Sullivan Field is a baseball park located in San Antonio, Texas, United States. It is the home of the University of the Incarnate Word Cardinals baseball team of the NCAA Division I Southland Conference. It opened on April 8, 1989 with a 5–2 win over their cross-town rival, the St. Mary's Rattlers. Lights were added before the 2004 season so that night baseball would be possible.

In 2018, Phase I of stadium improvements to both the baseball and softball fields was completed.  Phase I included changing the field surface from Tiff 19 turf to AstroTurf RootZone Diamond OPS Series field turf, new backstops, netting and other improvements.  The baseball field backstop wall and home plate were moved forward.  Total cost of the first phase of improvements was $1.2 million.

See also
 List of NCAA Division I baseball venues

References

Baseball venues in San Antonio
Sports venues completed in 1989
Incarnate Word Cardinals baseball
Baseball venues in Texas